Down Missouri Way is a 1946 American musical film directed by Josef Berne and written by Sam Neuman. The film stars Martha O'Driscoll, John Carradine, Eddie Dean, William Wright, Roscoe Karns and Renee Godfrey. The film was released on August 15, 1946, by Producers Releasing Corporation.

Plot
An agricultural professor and her scientifically-raised mule get caught up in a film shoot in the Ozarks farming community. The mule is featured in the film and the professor and producer fall for each other to the chagrin of the film's lead.

Cast       
Martha O'Driscoll as Jane Colwell
John Carradine as Thorndyke 'Thorny' P. Dunning
Eddie Dean as Mortimer
William Wright as Mike Burton
Roscoe Karns as Press Agent
Renee Godfrey as Gloria Baxter
Mabel Todd as Cindy
Eddie Craven as Sam
Chester Clute as Prof. Shaw
Will Wright as Prof. Morris
Paul Scardon as Prof. Lewis
Earle Hodgins as Press Agent
The Tailor Maids as Singing Group 
The Notables as Singing Group

References

External links
 

1946 films
American musical comedy films
1946 musical comedy films
Producers Releasing Corporation films
Films set in Missouri
Films shot in California
American black-and-white films
Films directed by Josef Berne
1940s English-language films
1940s American films